Commandant Bouan (F797) is a  in the French Navy. The ship is homeported in Toulon.

Design 

Crewed by 90 sailors, these vessels have the reputation of being among the most difficult in bad weather. Their high windage makes them particularly sensitive to pitch and roll as soon as the sea is formed.

Their armament, consequent for a vessel of this tonnage, allows them to manage a large spectrum of missions. During the Cold War, they were primarily used to patrol the continental shelf of the Atlantic Ocean in search of Soviet Navy submarines. Due to the poor performance of the hull sonar, as soon as an echo appeared, the reinforcement of an anti-submarine warfare frigate was necessary to chase it using its towed variable depth sonar.

Their role as patrollers now consists mainly of patrols and assistance missions, as well as participation in UN missions (blockades, flag checks) or similar marine policing tasks (fight against drugs, extraction of nationals, fisheries control, etc.). The anti-ship missiles have been landed, but they carry several machine guns and machine guns, more suited to their new missions.

Its construction cost was estimated at 270,000,000 French francs.

Construction and career 
Commandant Bouan was laid down on 12 October 1981 at Arsenal de Lorient, Lorient. Launched on 23 May 1983 and commissioned on 11 May 1984.

On 15 July 2008, at 9:12 a.m., while she was preparing to leave the port of Nice (Alpes-Maritimes) where he had spent three days on the occasion of the 14 July ceremonies, the ship collided with the quay at the level of its bow during its departure maneuver, a port pilot being on board and a tug hitched up. The damage consisted mainly of a sinking of the bow above the waterline, which was the subject of a makeshift repair by DCNS personnel, dispatched to the site. It delayed by 24 hours before reaching Toulon, its homport, where final repairs were carried out during the unavailability for maintenance, already scheduled for this ship in September and October 2008.

In June 2021, Commandant Bouan participated in anti-piracy missions in the Gulf of Guinea off Nigeria.

In May 2022, the ship evaluated the SMDM (navy mini-drone system) over a four week period. It was subsequently indicated that she would be permanently equipped with the system in order to enhance her surveillance capabilities.

She is scheduled to be withdrawn from service in 2026 and be replaced by one of a new class of ocean-going Patrol Vessels (the Patrouilleurs Océanique).

Citations 

Ships built in Lorient
1983 ships
D'Estienne d'Orves-class avisos
Maritime incidents in 2008